The 1995 Citizen Cup singles was a tennis event played on outdoor clay courts at the Am Rothenbaum in Hamburg in Germany that was part of Tier II of the 1995 WTA Tour. The 1995 Citizen Cup tournament was held from May 1 through May 7, 1995.

Arantxa Sánchez Vicario was the defending champion but did not compete that year. Conchita Martínez won in the final 6–1, 6–0 against Martina Hingis.

Seeds
A champion seed is indicated in bold text while text in italics indicates the round in which that seed was eliminated. The top four seeds received a bye to the second round.

  Mary Pierce (second round)
  Conchita Martínez (champion)
  Jana Novotná (second round)
  Magdalena Maleeva (semifinals)
  Anke Huber (semifinals)
  Brenda Schultz (second round)
  Judith Wiesner (quarterfinals)
  Barbara Rittner (quarterfinals)

Draw

Final

Section 1

Section 2

External links
 ITF tournament edition details

1995 WTA Tour